Bell-bottoms (or flares) are a style of trousers that become wider from the knees downward, forming a bell-like shape of the trouser leg. These are similar to flared jeans.

History

Naval origins

In the early 19th century, when a standardized uniform did not yet exist in the U.S. Navy, some sailors adopted a style of wide trousers ending in bell-shaped cuffs. In 1813, one of the first recorded descriptions of sailors' uniforms, written by Commodore Stephen Decatur, noted that the men on the frigates United States and Macedonia were wearing "glazed canvas hats with stiff brims, decked with streamers of ribbon, blue jackets buttoned loosely over waistcoats, and blue trousers with bell bottoms."

The British Royal Navy had often been a leader in nautical fashion, but bell-bottoms did not become part of the standard uniform until the mid-19th century. These "bell-bottoms" were often just very wide-legged trousers, rather than shaped trousers that flared below the knee. They continued in use as a distinctive feature of the RN rating's "square rig" uniform until replaced by more conventionally flared trousers in 1977.

Although the trousers of the present-day uniform of the United States Navy are still referred to as "bell-bottomed", they simply have large straight legs. The wearer's thigh fills the upper trouser leg, making the bottom of the pants leg appear flared. This style has been popular for many years, perhaps originally because the trouser leg can be rolled up easily, allowing the wearer to work in bare feet, but there is no reliable documentation that confirms a specific timeline or reason for the popularity of bell-bottomed trousers in naval apparel. 

Some modern naval uniforms continue to use bell-bottomed trousers as a potential life-saving device. The trouser material is made of cotton fibers that swell when wet and can hold air. In the event of a sailor falling overboard or having to abandon ship without a life vest, the bell-bottomed trousers can be quickly removed in the water without having to remove footwear. As part of their survival training, sailors are taught to remove the trousers while floating, tie the leg bottoms in a knot, and then use one of several methods to inflate the trousers with air. The inflated trousers can provide extra flotation while awaiting rescue.

Other traditional usages 
Bell-bottoms have also been worn for centuries by European carpenters, which is explained by the fact that the widening legs prevent sawdust from falling onto their shoes or feet. Bell-bottoms are still worn by carpenters who decide to spend their time after the apprenticeship as journeymen on the road.

1960s, 1970s, 1980s and 1990s

In the 1960s bell-bottoms became fashionable for both men and women in London and expanded into Europe and North America. They were usually worn with Cuban-heeled shoes, clogs, or Chelsea boots. Toni Basil, who was a go-go dancer when the 1964 concert film the T.A.M.I. Show was released, appeared in the film wearing bell-bottoms with a baby doll blouse.
 Bell-bottoms are mentioned in the popular 1971 music single "Bell Bottom Blues" by blues-rock group Derek and the Dominos.

In the 1970s, bell-bottoms moved back into mainstream fashion via Brian Spiller; Sonny and Cher helped popularize bell-bottoms in the US by wearing them on their popular television show. The pants were typically flared from the knee down, with bottom leg openings of up to twenty-six inches. Made from denim, bright cotton and satin polyester, they were so popular that they became a symbol of the outlandish and colorful style of the decade.

Loon pants (shortened from "balloon pants") were a variant on bell-bottomed trousers, with an increased flare. They were worn occasionally by go-go dancers on the British television music variety show Ready Steady Go! in 1966.

Elephant bells, popular in the mid-to-late 1970s, were similar to loon pants, but were typically made of denim. Elephant bells had a marked flare below the knee, often covering the wearer's shoes.

After the rise of punk rock in the late 1970s, bell-bottoms began to become less-fashionable as the decade drew to a close. By 1979, skin-tight trousers or 1950s-style drain pipes were much more in vogue, with bell-bottoms been seen as having had their day, remaining in fashion circa 1967–1979.

A revival of bell-bottoms occurred after bands such as The Stone Roses, Happy Mondays and The Charlatans re-introduced them in late 1989 and the early 1990s.

Mid-1990s to 2000s
In 1996, women's bell-bottoms were reintroduced to the mainstream public, under the name "boot-cut" (or "bootleg") trousers as the flare was slimmer. By 1999,  flare jeans had come into vogue among women, which had a wider, more exaggerated flare than boot-cuts. The boot-cut  style ended up dominating the fashion world for 10 years.

By around 2006, the bell-shaped silhouette started to fade as the skinny jean rose in popularity. Sharon Haver, the founder and editor-in-chief of online fashion magazine FocusOnStyle.com, commented "It's as if all the girls wearing premium boot-cut jeans threw them away one day, and the next day began wearing skinny jeans and flats."

Women's boot-cut jeans are tighter at the knee than men's, and flare out from knee to hem. Men's styles are traditionally straight-legged, although the pants came in a more flared style in the early and mid 2000s, but this was optional. The bell-bottoms of the 1960s and 1970s can be distinguished from the flare or boot-cut of the 1990s and 2000s by the tightness of the fabric at the knee.

See also
Phat pants
Wide leg jeans
Bell sleeve

References

External links

Hippie movement
1960s fads and trends
1970s fads and trends
Jeans by type
American fashion
History of clothing (Western fashion)
History of fashion
1960s fashion
1970s fashion
1990s fashion
2000s fashion
Trousers and shorts
1980s fashion